Miedźno  is a village in Kłobuck County, Silesian Voivodeship, in southern Poland. It is the seat of the gmina (administrative district) called Gmina Miedźno.

The village has a population of 2,529.

References

Villages in Kłobuck County